Baranof River is a glacially-fed river on the eastern side of Baranof Island, in the Alexander Archipelago, in the Alaska Panhandle. The source of the river is the unnamed icefields surrounding Peak 5390. Baranof River feeds into Baranof Lake, and the outlet of Baranof Lake that feeds into Warm Springs Bay is also commonly referred to as Baranof River as well.

Baranof River was named for Alexandr Baranov, the first governor of the Russian-American Company.

References

See also
List of Alaska rivers

Rivers of Alaska
Rivers of Sitka, Alaska